Ērgļi Parish is an administrative unit of Madona Municipality in the Vidzeme region of Latvia. At the beginning of 2014, the population of the parish was 2421. The administrative center is Ērgļi village.

Towns, villages and settlements of Ērgļi Parish 
 Ērgļi
 Katrīna

References

External links 
 

Parishes of Latvia
Madona Municipality
Vidzeme